Eatoniella is a genus of minute sea snails, marine gastropod mollusks in the family Eatoniellidae, the eatoniellids.

Species
Species within the genus Eatoniella include:

 Eatoniella afronigra Ponder & Worsfold, 1994
 Eatoniella ainsworthi (Hedley, 1916)
 Eatoniella albocolumella Ponder, 1965
 Eatoniella alboelata Ponder, 1983
 Eatoniella algoensis (Thiele, 1925)
 Eatoniella ansonae Ponder & Yoo, 1978
 Eatoniella argentinensis Castellanos & Fernández, 1972
 Eatoniella atervisceralis Ponder, 1965
 Eatoniella atrella Ponder & Yoo, 1978
 Eatoniella atropurpurea (Frauenfeld, 1867)
 Eatoniella australiensis (Thiele, 1930)
 Eatoniella bathamae Ponder, 1965
 Eatoniella bennetti (Preston, 1912)
 Eatoniella caliginosa (Smith, 1875)
 Eatoniella cana Ponder, 1983
 Eatoniella capensis Thiele, 1912
 Eatoniella castanea Ponder & Worsfold, 1994
 Eatoniella contusa Ponder, 1983
 Eatoniella delli Ponder, 1965
 Eatoniella demissa (Smith, 1915)
 Eatoniella denticula Ponder & Worsfold, 1994
 Eatoniella depressa Ponder & Yoo, 1978
 Eatoniella dilatata (Powell, 1955)
 Eatoniella duperrei (Vélain, 1877)
 Eatoniella ebenina Ponder & Worsfold, 1994
 Eatoniella exigua Ponder & Yoo, 1978
 Eatoniella flammulata (Hutton, 1878)
 Eatoniella fossa Ponder, 1965
 Eatoniella fulva Ponder & Yoo, 1978
 Eatoniella fuscosubula Ponder, 1965
 Eatoniella galbinia (Laseron, 1950)
 Eatoniella georgiana (Pfeffer, 1886) (nomen dubium)
 Eatoniella glacialis (Smith, 1907)
 Eatoniella globosa Ponder, 1965
 Eatoniella glomerosa Ponder & Worsfold, 1994
 Eatoniella helga (Bartsch, 1915)
 Eatoniella hewittae Ponder & Yoo, 1978
 Eatoniella howensis Ponder & Yoo, 1978
 Eatoniella hyalina Thiele, 1912
 † Eatoniella insueta (Laws, 1950) 
 Eatoniella iredalei (Oliver, 1915)
 Eatoniella janetaylorae Kay, 1979
 Eatoniella juliae Ponder & Yoo, 1978
 Eatoniella kerguelenensis (Smith, 1875)
 † Eatoniella laevicordata (Laws, 1940) 
 Eatoniella lampra (Suter, 1908)
 Eatoniella latebricola Ponder, 1965
 Eatoniella limbata (Hutton, 1883)
 Eatoniella lineata Worsfold, Avern & Ponder, 1993
 Eatoniella lutea (Suter, 1908)
 Eatoniella mcleani Ponder & Worsfold, 1994
 Eatoniella melanochroma (Tate, 1899)
 Eatoniella minima (Thiele, 1925)
 Eatoniella mortoni Ponder, 1965
 Eatoniella nigra (d'Orbigny, 1841)
 Eatoniella notalabia Ponder, 1965
 Eatoniella notalbula Ponder, 1965
 Eatoniella notata Ponder & Yoo, 1977
 Eatoniella obtusispira (Powell, 1955)
 Eatoniella occulta Ponder, 1983
 Eatoniella olivacea (Hutton, 1882)
 Eatoniella pallida (Powell, 1937)
 Eatoniella pellucida (Tate & May, 1900)
 Eatoniella perforata Ponder, 1965
 Eatoniella pfefferi (Suter, 1909)
 Eatoniella picea Ponder & Worsfold, 1994
 Eatoniella pigmenta Kay, 1979
 Eatoniella poutama (E. C. Smith, 1962)
 † Eatoniella praecursor (Laws, 1939) 
 Eatoniella prestoni Ponder & Yoo, 1978
 Eatoniella pullmitra Ponder, 1965
 Eatoniella puniceolinea Ponder & Yoo, 1978
 Eatoniella puniceomacer Ponder, 1965
 Eatoniella rakiura Ponder, 1965
 † Eatoniella rivertonensis (Finlay, 1924) 
 Eatoniella roseocincta (Suter, 1908)
 Eatoniella roseola (Iredale, 1915)
 Eatoniella roseospira (Powell, 1937)
 † Eatoniella sedicula (Laws, 1941) 
 Eatoniella shepherdi Ponder & Yoo, 1978
 Eatoniella smithae Ponder, 1965
 Eatoniella stewartiana Ponder, 1965
 Eatoniella strebeli Ponder & Worsfold, 1994
 † Eatoniella subexcavata (Laws, 1941) 
 Eatoniella subgoniostoma Strebel, 1908
 Eatoniella subrufescens (E. A. Smith, 1875)
 Eatoniella talboti Ponder & Yoo, 1978
 Eatoniella taylorae Ponder & Yoo, 1978
 Eatoniella tenella (Powell, 1937)
 Eatoniella thalia (Bartsch, 1915)
 Eatoniella tristanensis Worsfold, Avern & Ponder, 1993
 Eatoniella trochiformis Worsfold, Avern & Ponder, 1993
 Eatoniella turricula Ponder & Worsfold, 1994
 Eatoniella varicifera Ponder, 1983
 Eatoniella varicolor Ponder, 1965
 Eatoniella verecunda (Suter, 1908)
 Eatoniella victoriae Ponder & Yoo, 1978
 Eatoniella zigzag Ponder & Worsfold, 1994

Species brought into synonymy
 Eatoniella huttoni (Pilsbry, 1888): synonym of Eatoniella flammulata (Hutton, 1878)
Eatoniella kerguelensis [sic]: synonym of Eatoniella kerguelenensis (E. A. Smith, 1875)
 Eatoniella maculosa Ponder, 1965: synonym of Eatoniella notata Ponder & Yoo, 1977
 Eatoniella nigra (Krauss, 1848): synonym of Eatoniella afronigra Ponder & Worsfold, 1994
 Eatoniella paludinoides E. A. Smith, 1902: synonym of Skenella paludinoides (E. A. Smith, 1902)
 Eatoniella pusilla Thiele, 1912 : synonym of Eatonina pusilla (Thiele, 1912)
 Eatoniella rubrooperculata Castellanos & Fernández, 1972: synonym of Barleeia rubrooperculata (Castellanos & Fernández, 1972)
 Eatoniella thola Ponder, 1965: synonym of Crassitoniella thola (Ponder, 1965)

References

 Spencer, H.; Marshall. B. (2009). All Mollusca except Opisthobranchia. In: Gordon, D. (Ed.) (2009). New Zealand Inventory of Biodiversity. Volume One: Kingdom Animalia. 584 pp

External links
 Iredale T. (1915). A commentary on Suter's Manual of the New Zealand Mollusca. Transactions and Proceedings of the New Zealand Institute 47: 417-497
 Bruce A. Marshall, Molluscan and brachiopod taxa introduced by F. W. Hutton in The New Zealand journal of science; Journal of the Royal Society of New Zealand, Volume 25, Issue 4, 1995

Eatoniellidae
Gastropod genera
Taxa named by William Healey Dall